Beingmate Baby & Child Food Co., Ltd. or known as just Beingmate, is a Chinese food manufacturer. It is headquartered in Hangzhou, China. Founded in 1992, it was a leading milk powder brand in China, but declined in the recent years. In March 2015, Fonterra Cooperative Group purchased 18.8% of Beingmate.

Beingmate is listed on the Shenzhen Stock Exchange. It was a constituent of the exchange's mid cap index SZSE 200 Index, but was removed in January 2017. It was inserted to small cap index SZSE 700 Index instead.

Product sites
Beingmate owned 51% stake in a powder plant in Darnum, Victoria, Australia, with the rest was owned by Fonterra.

References

External links 
  

Companies listed on the Shenzhen Stock Exchange
Dairy products companies of China
Chinese companies established in 1992
Manufacturing companies based in Hangzhou
Multinational companies headquartered in China